The King's Head is a Grade II listed public house at 84 Upper Tooting Road, Tooting, London SW17 7PB.

It was built in 1896 by the architect W. M. Brutton.

It is on the Campaign for Real Ale's National Inventory of Historic Pub Interiors. CAMRA describe it as "an historic pub interior of national importance".
Grade II listing;- I 1896 by W M Brunton, a prolific designer of public houses. Perhaps his masterpiece and his least altered interior. Florid symmetrical composition; brashness of detail typical of late 19th century gin palace. Red brick with stucco ornamentation. Slate roof. Central portion three windows three-storeys, steep hipped roof rising to a dome. Large decorated lucarne over second floor windows, bears inscription "The Kings Head". First floor three pairs of French windows open on to verandah with iron balustrade and ogee roof. Ground floor splayed bay with entrance to bar. Flanking portion each side two-storeys plus mansard with pointed dormer behind balustrade. Wings each side 1 1/2-storeys, one window, ramped parapet pierced by a bull's-eye window on the left. Right wing a facade only; first floor window is blank with inscription "Rebuilt 1896". Interior rich with cut brilliant glass, patterned tiles and wrought iron.

Today,  Kings head is known as a busy sports pub. It was recently voted as "Best Pub in Tooting" by Londonist.com.

During Euro 2020, Kings Head hosted the official trophy for a day, which brought hundreds of people from all around London. It appeared on ITV news.

References

Pubs in the London Borough of Wandsworth
Grade II listed buildings in the London Borough of Wandsworth
Grade II listed pubs in London
Commercial buildings completed in 1896
National Inventory Pubs
Tooting